Each branch of the United States Armed Forces has its own uniforms and regulations regarding them.

Uniforms of the U.S. Army
Uniforms of the U.S. Marine Corps
Uniforms of the U.S. Navy
Uniforms of the U.S. Air Force
Uniforms of the U.S. Space Force
Uniforms of the U.S. Coast Guard

Combat uniforms overview

Service dress uniforms overview

Current camouflage patterns

See also
Physical training uniform
Military badges of the United States
Awards and decorations of the United States Armed Forces
I. Spiewak & Sons, manufacturers of apparel for U.S. Army, U.S. Navy, and U.S. Air Force during World War I, World War II, and Korean War

References

Military equipment of the United States